Air Anatolia (Turkish: Anadolu Havacılık A.Ş.) was a charter airline from Turkey, which was operational between 1996 and 2002.

Fleet
Over the years, Air Anatolia operated the following aircraft types:

References

External links

Defunct airlines of Turkey
Defunct charter airlines of Turkey
Airlines established in 1998
Airlines disestablished in 2002